Fackler is a surname. Notable people with the surname include:

 David Parks Fackler (1841–1924), American actuary
 Martin Fackler (1933–2015), American military officer, surgeon and wound ballistics expert
 Martin Fackler (journalist) (born 1966), American journalist and author
 Nik Fackler, American filmmaker and musician

See also
 Fackler, Alabama, unincorporated community in Jackson County